The 2012–13 season is Maccabi Haifa's 55th season in Israeli Premier League, and their 31st consecutive season in the top division of Israeli football.

Club

Squad

Players out on loan

Transfers

Summer transfers

Winter transfers

Current coaching staff

{|class="wikitable"
|+
! style="background-color:#FFFFFF; color:#000000;" scope="col"|Position
! style="background-color:#FFFFFF; color:#000000;" scope="col"|Staff
|-

Pre-season and friendlies

Competitions

Ligat Ha'Al

Regular season 
With Reuven Atar

With Arik Benado

Table

Play-off

Table

Results summary

Results by round

Israel State Cup

Toto Cup

Group stage

Knockout phase

Maccabi Netanya won 4-3 on aggregate

Squad statistics

Updated on 30 Jen. 2013

Goals

Disciplinary record

Penalties

External links
 Maccabi Haifa website

Maccabi Haifa F.C. seasons
Maccabi Haifa
Maccabi Haifa